Wauconda Pass (el. 4310 ft./1314 m.) is a high mountain pass in the state of Washington, east of the town of Wauconda. It is traversed by State Route 20.

References 

Mountain passes of Washington (state)
Mountain passes of Okanogan County, Washington
Transportation in Okanogan County, Washington